The Pacific Marine Environmental Laboratory (PMEL) is a federal laboratory in the National Oceanic and Atmospheric Administration (NOAA) Office of Oceanic and Atmospheric Research (OAR). It is one of seven NOAA Research Laboratories (RLs). The PMEL is split across two sites in the Pacific Northwest, in Seattle, Washington and Newport, Oregon.

Research
PMEL carries out interdisciplinary scientific investigations in oceanography and atmospheric science to improve our understanding of the complex physical and geochemical processes operating in the world oceans, especially the Pacific Ocean, to define the forcing functions and the processes driving ocean circulation and the global climate system, and to improve environmental forecasting capabilities and other supporting services for marine commerce and fisheries.

See also
 Arctic Report Card
 NOAA Center for Tsunami Research

References

External links

PMEL projects 
 El Nino
 Tropical Atmosphere Ocean (TAO) project 
 
 Carbon Program
 Argo Profiling CTD floats, ocean weather system
 Earth-Ocean Interactions Program, underwater volcanoes & deep sea ecosystems
 Acoustics Program, underwater volcanoes & deep sea ecosystems
 EcoFOCI, Fisheries Oceanography
 Atmospheric Chemistry Group
 Ocean Climate Stations (OCS)
 Arctic

National Oceanic and Atmospheric Administration
Climate change organizations based in the United States
Oceanographic organizations
Pacific Ocean